Antti Hackzell's cabinet was the 27th government of Republic of Finland. Cabinet's time period was from September 8, 1944 to October 21, 1944. It was a majority government.

Hackzell's  government's main task was to get Finland out of the war against Soviet Union.
At the end of August Antti Hackzell obtained a negotiation  link with Moscow and on  September 2 the government agreed to an armistice which started two days later.

Hackzell travelled to Moscow to negotiate the peace treaty but he suffered a bad stroke on September 14 and couldn no longer continue his work as minister. Foreign minister Carl Enckell succeeded him in making the Moscow Armistice treaty. New prime minister Urho Castrén took office and formed a new cabinet.

References

 

Hackzell
1944 establishments in Finland
1944 disestablishments in Finland
Cabinets established in 1944
Cabinets disestablished in 1944